Andrzej Kaznowski (born 23 December 1935) is a Polish former Communist politician who was the mayor of Gdańsk from 1973 to 1977.

In 1964, he graduated from Gdańsk College of Education (later the University of Gdańsk). He became a member of the Polish United Workers' Party in 1960 and later held a number of bureaucratic positions in the city. Kaznowski was the mayor of Gdańsk from 13 December 1973 to 15 September 1977. He was the first mayor of the city after the city council split the offices of mayor and the presidium of the National City Council. He began the twin city program between Gdańsk and Bremen in what was then West Germany, the first of its kind in Poland. He was succeeded by Jerzy Młynarczyk. He later worked in a number of diplomatic positions before going into private enterprise.

References

1935 births
Living people
Politicians from Gdańsk
People from Gdynia
Mayors of Gdańsk
20th-century Polish politicians
Polish Workers' Party politicians